Karen Else Caroline Berg (28 May 1906 in Copenhagen – 15 November 1995 in Charlottenlund) was a Danish actress.

Theatrical career 
She first attended ballet school, then the theatrical school of the Royal Danish Theater. She debuted there in 1927 and remained until 1978. Later in her career she became known for character parts in plays like Sparekassen, performed in 1963, The Fidget in 1967, and The Political Tinker in 1972.

Selected TV-series 
 Huset på Christianshavn (1970-1977) - Mrs. Dagmar Hammerstedt
 Matador (1978-1982) - Mrs. Fernando Møhge

Selected filmography 
She appeared in more than twenty Danish feature films. Some of them are:
 Sommer Glæder (1940) - Mrs. Rasmussen
 Lucky Journey (1947) - Rasmussen
 Historien om Hjortholm (1950) - Wife of the old count
 Det var paa Rundetaarn (1955) - Mrs. Hald
 Baronessen fra benzintanken (The Baroness from the Gas Station) (1960) - Astrid von Pleum, governess
 Dronningens vagtmester (1963) - Mette Gyde
 Kampen om Næsbygård (1964) - Helene
 The Heir to Næsbygaard (1965) - Helene
 Krybskytterne på Næsbygård (1966) - Helene
 Magic in Town (1968) - Auntie Alma

Awards and honours
She was honoured as a Knight of the Dannebrog, 1st Class.

She is mentioned in Kraks Blå Bog (Krak's Blue Book).

References

External links 
 
 Karen Berg on gravsted.dk
 Karen Berg on Danish Film Database
 Karen Berg on Billed Bladet
 Karen Berg on danskefilm.dk
 Karen Berg Krak's Blå Bog 1974

Knights First Class of the Order of the Dannebrog
1906 births
1995 deaths
20th-century Danish actresses
Danish film actresses
Danish television actresses
Danish stage actresses
Actresses from Copenhagen